Chaophraya Phitsanulok (1719 – November 1768), personal name Rueang or Boonrueang, was appointed as the Governor of Phitsanulok city with the noble title Chaophraya Surasi Bisanuvadhiraj, from 1732 to 1767 during the reign of King Borommakot until the second fall of Ayutthaya Kingdom occurred during the reign of King Ekkathat. In Thonburi Interim, he structured Phitsanulok and part of Nakhon Sawan city as a new state–independent, and soon proclaimed himself as King Ruang of Phitsanulok or Prince Ruang, the King of Siam. His existential descendants were bestowed the Thai noble surname Rochanakul, meaning–patronymic of Chaophraya Phitsanulok (Rueang)’s family, royally given by King Rama VI.

Biography

Ancestry 
Rueang was born in Ayutthaya Kingdom, descended from Chaophra Pichayasurindara, a sovereign's grandson of King Phetracha, in Ban Phlu Luang dynasty, lately became H.R.H. Prince of Krommamun Indarabhakdi conferred by King Thai Sa era. His wife named Lady Qingchiang lady of Phitsanulok, half Siamese-Chinese women of the Chen family, and a daugther of Phraya Rajsubhawadi, who lives in the vicinity of Chinese village in Ayutthaya. His younger brother was Deputy Governor of Phitsanulok; Phra Indara-akorn, or Phraya Chaiyabun, personal name Chan. His mother died in the nearby of the second fall of Ayutthaya Kingdom interim. In The Royal Chronicle of Letters by the King's Own Hand, written by Prince Damrong Rajanubhab, contemplated a relation between Chaofa Chit, the grandson of King Phetracha and Chaophraya Phitsanulok (Rueang) as either way of kinship.

Early career 

In early life, Rueang was in service of Siamese military affairs and scribe in Krom Mahatthai of Ayutthaya Kingdom during King Thai Sa era. 

During his adolescence, he was mostly in service in Military affairs at Phitsanulok, coordinating officially with Luang Pinit Akson (Thongdi). Lately, His was a permanent secretary of Phitsanulok city.

In adulthood, after previous the Governor of Phitsanulok died, the King Borommakot royally appointed Rueang as the Governor of Phitsanulok and conferred on him with the noble title Chaophraya Surasi Bisanuvadhiraj (a regent of northern region and his younger brother as deputy Governor of Phitsanulok to service the King.
During Burmese–Siamese War (1765–1767), Chaophraya Phitsanulok (Rueang) was appointed as commander of northern military affairs, lately he was admired-ambivalent reputation as a famous-elder warrior and respected by numbers of Ayutthaya courtiers in which he successfully defeated Burmese royal troops to attack Phisanulok city during Burmese–Siamese War (1765–1767).

In The Royal Sword by Ministry of Interior (Thailand) said :-

Death 

In 1768, after the post-second fall of Ayutthaya Kingdom interim, Chaophraya Phitsanulok (Rueang) proclaimed himself as King Ruang, to be King of Siam.
Lately, he occupied the throne for only six months (some sources said he died only 7 days after the ceremony) and died in November, 1768 of a coughing fit, (vary sources said he died of abscess, scrofula, or smallpox symptom. See: Death and collapse of the regime), when he was forty-nine years old. (Another source said he was fifty-two years old.) His younger-brother, Phraya Chaiyabun (Chan), ruled Phitsanulok city afterward.

Burmese Invasion and the second fall of Ayutthaya Kingdom

Resistance

Background 
Lan Na (Thailand's history, preferably called Chiang Mai) was in apparent rebellion against the Burmese royal court during 1761–1763, when it was state-independent and currently under the reign of Phraya Chantha and the supportive military of Ayutthaya Kingdom. According to the allegation of the Burmese King's lese majeste, King Naungdawgyi, the King of Burma deployed royal Burmese troops of 50,000 men and appointed General Ne Myo Thihapate as commander-in-chief to criminalize Chiang Mai city.

Chiang Mai defeated by Burmese troops 
In January 1762, Phraya Chantha of Chiang Mai wrote a royal letter with tribute presented to King Ekkathat, the King of Siam, informing him of an invasion from Burma and requesting that Chiang Mai become a tributary state of Siam and request Siam troops to fight against the Burmese troops.

King Ekkathat deployed Siamese troops of 5,000 men, and appointed Chaophraya Phitsanulok (Rueang), as commander-in-chief. Once Phitsanulok’s army arrived at Ban Rahaeng located in Tak city, approximately 280 km south of Chiang Mai. However, Chiang Mai was already defeated by Burmese troops within 4–5 months, and Abyagamani ( get appointed to rule Chiang Mai, state-colonial of Burma. King Ekkathat acknowledged that then stated a royal order to discharge Phitsanulok troops.

The Royal Chronicle of the Kingdom of Ayutthaya said :-

On November 28, 1762. King Hsinbyushin of Burma enthroned according to King Alaungpaya died. To uphold Alaungpaya’s wish, King Hsinbyushin assembled Burmese troops of 20,000 men to reinforce his troops in Chiang Mai in 1763. Not only did General Ne Myo Thihapate get appointed to control the troops, but numbers of courtiers were also appointed in readiness for marching to Ayutthaya Kingdom.

The Royal Chronicle of Myanmar composed in 1913 A.D. by Prince Narathip Praphanphong said :-

a Siege of Burmese troops in northern cities of Siam 

The large two arrays of the Burmese expeditionary army marched to Ayutthaya Kingdom in 1765; the northern array of Burmese troops, as the main front, commanded by Ne Myo Thihapate, numbered over 20,000 men (in the history of Thailand, up to 10,000 men) during their stay in Lampang city nearby Ayutthaya Kingdom. While the south array of the combined troops, approximately 20,000 men, was commanded by Maha Nawrahta
King Ekkathat then appointed Chaophraya Phitsanulok (Rueang), Governor of Phitsanulok, as commander-in-chief of the northern front to eliminate the Burmese troops from northern cities to the Ayutthaya Kingdom's center. Consequently, the Governor of Phitsanulok marched to Ayutthaya where he encamped at Wat Phu Khao Thong (or The Golden Mountain Temple) located approximately 3 km northwest of the Ayutthaya Grand Palace, where the architecture-Mon pagoda in the temple was built by King Bayinnaung in 1569 as the monument of Burmese victory in Burmese–Siamese War (1568–1569), a.k.a the first fall of Ayutthaya Kingdom.

After Ne Myo Thihapate had already seized Kamphaeng Phet city at the end of the rainy season, the History of Burma stated that Ne Myo Thihapate had successfully seized the Ayutthaya Kingdom's principle northern cities; Sukhothai and Phitsanulok, which Burmese historical materials were completely contradictory compared to History of Siam. Many The Royal Chronicles of Siam stated that Chaophraya Phitsanulok (Rueang), the Governor of Phitsanulok, triumphed over Ne Myo Thihapate's troops at Sukhothai and Phitsanulok became a shelter for tremendous Ayutthaya courtiers and the Siamese Royal family of the Ban Phlu Luang Dynasty. a.k.a Chaophraya Phitsanulok (Rueang)’s gathering. in 1767–1769., the largest gathering in Thonburi interim.

A battle between Ne Myo Thihapate and Governor of Phitsanulok 

During the encampment of Phitsanulok troops at Wat Phu Khao Thong, Chaophraya Phitsanulok (Rueang), the commander-in-chief, requested royal permission to return to Phitsanilok city to incinerate his mother’s remains by informing to King Ekkathat through  Phraya Phonladep, and left his three subordinates; Luang Mahatthai, Luang Kosa and Luang thepsena, in charge his troops. Then the King granted the permission. Prince Damrong Rajanubhab pointed out that it was impossible that the governor of Phitsanulok could be allowed to return to Phitsanilok city during the Burmese-Siamese war incident.

Later, King Ekkathat appointed Chaophraya Phitsanulok (Rueang) to suppress Burmese troops commanded by Ne Myo Thihapate marching from the northern of the Ayutthaya Kingdom.

The Royal Chronicle of the Kingdom of Ayutthaya said :-

Burmese History side 
In August 1765. Gen. Ne Myo Thihapate marched the Burmese troop of 40,000 men from Lampang downward to south. Unfortunately, his march was interrupted by Siamese troops sporadically during the movement. Consequently, Ne Myo Thihapate successfully seized all of the northern major cities and camped at Phitsanilok.

The Royal Chronicle of Myanmar composed in 1913 A.D. by Prince Narathip Praphanphong said :-

And Yodayar Naing Mawgun by Letwe Nawrahta , translated by Soe Thuzar Myint said in Second Part, Stanza 11 that :-

Siamese History side 
On August 22, 1765. Gen. Ne Myo Thihapate marched 40,000 Burmese troops south from Lampang and successfully seized northern cities; Pichai, Sawan Lok and Sukhothai. Phraya Sukhothai, governor of Sukhothai, intercepted Burmese troops, and Ne Myo Thihapate encamped at Sukhothai city. Chaophraya Phitsanulok (Rueang) and the chief advisor of the northern city arrayed the reinforcements and marched immediately to Sukhothai.

The Siamese reinforcement-expeditionary troops, commanded by the governor of Phitsanulok, engaged Ne Myo Thihapate’s Burmese troops in November 1765.

In Yodaya Naing Mawgun by Letwe Nawrahta said :-

And The Royal Chronicle of Myanmar composed in 1913 A.D. by Prince Narathip Praphanphong said :-

Chaofa Chit’s Rebellion in Phitsanulok 

During the battle of Burmese and Siamese troops at Sukhothai city, another group of Phitsanulok subsidiary troops, which were still encamped at Wat Phu Khao Thong, commanded by three subordinates of governor of Phitsanulok: Luang Mahatthai, Luang Kosa, and Luang Depsena.

Prince Chit was imprisoned in Ayutthaya Grand Place, Luang Kosa intrigued underhandedly and fled from Phitsanulok’s troop to assist him. Prince Chit, then bribed the prison officials and fled with Luang Kosa, H.S.H. Chim and his aides to Phisanulok, the northern city.

The Royal Chronicle of the Kingdom of Ayutthaya said :-

In December 1765. Chaophraya Phitsanulok (Rueang) triumphed over Ne Myo Thihapate’s troops. The Burmese troops dispersed back to Nakhon Sawan. The governor of Phitsanulok encamped in Sukhothai near the border of Phitsanulok where the combat engagement still continued.

King Ekkathat acknowledged Prince Chit’s jailbreak and then appointed officials to follow them, but they failed to catch them.

On his arrival to Phitsanulok, where there were only a few noblemen and the governor's wife; Lady Qingchaing, Prince Chit not only seized Phitsanulok city and proclaimed himself as governor of Phitsanulok, but he also forfeited and committed arson against Chaophraya Phitsanulok (Rueang)’s house.

Lady Qingchaing and her slaves, fled to Sukhuthai by floating upward along the Nan River, so that she could inform her spouse; Chaophraya Phitsanulok (Rueang) that Phitsanulok had been seized. Chaophraya Phitsanulok (Rueang) then deployed troops at the border of Phitsanulok, ruled by Prince Chit, and engaged with the rebel’s troops. Consequently, Prince Chit’s troops were dispersed and later captured by Chaophraya Phitsanulok (Rueang)’s troops. Unfortunately, all prisoners were unable to be restrained to Ayutthaya Royal Palace for punishment, the governor of Phitsanulok decided to execute all of them using the King's absolute power. Prince Chit was executed by drowning in the Nan River with the exception of his daughter; H.S.H. Chim (Thai: หม่อมเจ้าหญิงฉิม), who was acquitted.
Ne Myo Thihapate took this opportunity and continued to march reinforcements downward to Ayutthaya without engaging Phitsanulok’s army. Ne Myo Thihapate’s troops reached Ayutthaya on January 20, 1766, and besieged Ayutthaya with Maha Nawrahta’s army.

Escape of Siamese Royal family and courtiers to Phitsanulok 
Early in the second fall of Ayutthaya, on April 7, 1767, outer principal cities in the Ayutthaya Kingdom were dispersing a siege of Burmese troops. Ayutthaya’s Royal descendants, nobles, and men slipped hastily away from capital of Ayutthaya, fled avoidably to Phitsanulok, the great city in northern Siam with the strong figure of Chaophraya Phitsanulok (Rueang) who triumphed over Burmese troops, led by General Ne Myo Thihapate.

In 1767, Chaofa Chit, also known as H.R.H. Prince Chit The Prince of Krommakhun Surindarasongkram and his allies imprisoned at Ayutthaya Royal Palace, escaped by bribing officials with supportive nobleman; Luang Kosa, the Governor of Phitsanulok’s adjutant, then fled immediately to Phitsanulok with H.S.H. Chim, Chaofa Chit’s daughter. Consequently, he was executed by the order of the Governor of Phitsanulok where he caused trouble by seizing Phitsanulok and committing arson the city governor’s house.

One of old-closest friend of Chaophraya Phitsanulok (Rueang) named; Thongdi or Ocphra Akson Sunthonsat, a father of King Rama I, and who being the grand primogenitor of Chakri dynasty, fled to Phitsanulok with his wife; Bunma, his son; La and his aides, due to the Governor of Phitsanulok (Rueang) was his intimately familiar friend in his early life since he was in the service of Krom Mahatthai.

Thao Songkandan, the royal maid, lately was conferred as Royal mother in reign of King Taksin was sheltered herself and her family at Phitsanulok too.

According to the testimonials of Chen mo, Wen Shao and Lin Zhengchun said that Zhao wang ji is Krommamun Thepphiphit or Prince Khag, son of King Borommakot, the most formidable opponent of King Taksin, also fled to Phitsanulok under protection of Fu shi lu wang [the Governor of Phitsanulok (Rueang)] before he captured Nakhon Ratchasima and proclaim himself as a leader of Phimai's gathering.

Zhao wang ji sheltered himself under the protection of a local chief of Fu shi lu wang. Zhao wang ji is Kroma Mun Thepphiphit, who is a son of King Borommakot. Nithi points out that Kroma Mun Thepphiphit was the most formidable opponent of King Taksin… ...Zhao wang ji, who is a half elder brother of the King of Siam [King Ekathat] is around fifty years old. He is the son of the Siamese old King and a woman of the Baitou race.

The post-second fall of Ayutthaya, there were five powerful aspirants–independent for the position consequently, where the governor of Phitsanulok (Rueang) controls lower northern Siam; Phitsanulok, and a portion of Nakhon Sawan. Because of these large numbers of courtiers, perhaps ambitiously encouraging him in his royal proclamation so that to merely exalt himself to rule Phitsanulok as King of Siam.

Coronation as King of Siam 
In 1768. InThonburi interim, an insurrection incident had been occurring after the second fall of Ayutthaya, and there was no longer a central government. During the mid-year, Chaophraya Phitsanulok (Rueang) royally proclaimed himself as King Ruang, King of Siam on his dynastic connection, and also raised Phitsanulok city and a portion of Nakhon Sawan, totaling 7 counties, as the new capital of Ayutthaya Kingdom, the city was named; Krung Phra Phitsanulok Rajthani Sri Ayudhya Mahanakon. He also conferred on his family’s members, and many Ayudhyan courtiers to be in his service including his closest friend; Ocphra Akson Sunthonsat (Thongdi), the father of King Rama I, with the given noble title Chaophraya Chakri Sri Onkarak (Thongdi), with sakdina 10000 and it is likely that, as regent or superintendent of the supreme governor's chief adviser.

In the Letter of King Mongkut to Sir John Bowring said :-

Three aides of Chaophraya Chakri (Thongdi), Thong Khwan, Yim and Yam, son of Luang Raksena (Jamras), also received title, namely, Thong Khwan was Nai Chamnan, as staff officer, and both Yim and Yam were clerk in Military affairs a.k.a Krom Mahatthai of Phitsanulok, respectively. 

The coronation of Chao Phitsanulok was done traditionally according to the procedures of the King of Ayutthaya, except a parade procession around the city was postponed.

King Ruang resided at Chan Royal Palace in Phitsanulok until he died in November, 1768. Whilst King Ruang stayed at Phitsanulok, he was involved in skirmishes for at least six months of his reign, particularly with Chao Phra Fang a.k.a Priest King who preferred to take the initiative war to seize Phitsanulok.

King Ruang’s letter to China 
According to Qing Dynasty Archives, King Ruang of Phitsanulok wrote a royal letter in 1767, sealed with his Chinese name; Fu Shi Lu or Fu Shi Lu Wang, meaning of King Phitsanulok, and he sent it to China Government by barque preceding his coronation in 1768. The letter was obtained by Viceroy of Liangguang named; Li Shiyao and later presented to Qianlong Emperor, the emperor of the Qing dynasty on July 17, 1768 to report relevant situation of Siam. The King Ruang of Phitsanulok’s letter or Fu Shi Lu’s letter to which being sent to, was royally intended to ask the Chinese emperor for approval his status as the legitimate King of Siam as well as to forestall King Taksin from being recognized.

On September 29, 1768. Qianlong Emperor refused to approve King Taksin as legitimate King of Siam because he was not an heir apparent from the Ban Phlu Luang Dynasty. According to Fu Shi Lu’s letter, there are still Fu Shi Lu [Phitsanulok], Lukun [Nakohn Si Thammarat], and Gao Lie [Phimai (Prince Thepphiphit), royal descendant of Ban Phlu Luang Dynasty] in Siam who have not surrendered, and also asked Qianlong Emperor for approval of their status as King of Siam from Qianlong Emperor with Chinese imperial seal.

Whilst King Taksin sough approval from the Chinese emperor, he started seeking to purge the remaining princes of Ban Phlu Luang Dynasty.

Lately, Viceroy Li Shiyao, secretly investigated some political asylums with the governor of Ha Tian in order to find the left princes of Siam and to report relevant situation of Ha Tian city to the Chinese emperor. Qianlong Emperor discovered two live princes; Prince Chui, and Prince Sisang, descendants of Siam Dynasty, fled to Ha Tien and sheltered themselves after the burning of Ayutthaya. Whilst Prince Chui sheltered himself at Ha Tien, Qianlong Emperor recognized his status as legitimate King of Siam, and lately Prince Chui gathered troops in Ha Tien to seize King Taksin, the deplorable King of Siam.

Prince Sisang died at Ha Tien before being captured; Prince Chui was captured and killed by King Taksin in Siam during the interim Siamese–Vietnamese War (1771–1773).

He [Taksin] thus left the chieu khoa Lien to hold Ha Tien and returned to Siam by dap [battleship] with his main force, the captive Mac family and Chieu Chuy [Prince Chui]. The last-named was killed in Siam.

There is no apparent evidence that King Ruang was approved as the legitimate King of Siam despite the fact that he was a descendant of one royal member of the Ban Phlu Luang Dynasty, whilst King Ruang played a role in supporting remaining royal descendants. However, King Ruang of Phitsanulok’s letter or Fu Shi Lu’s letter proved that he had been enthroned as King of Siam in Phitsanulok at least six months or more.

Chaophraya Phitsanulok's gathering

Background 

After dominating Ayutthaya Kingdom for 417 years, the kingdom was destroyed on Tuesday, April 7, 1767. Siamese prisoners were herded forcibly to Burma in large numbers by Ne Myo Thihapate and Maha Nawrahta with the support of a Siamese spy named Phraya Phonlathep.
The Testimonies of the inhabitants of Ayutthaya said :-

There was a principal provincial city, Phitsanulok, located at the northern of the kingdom, to which Ayutthaya officials had fled before a siege of Burmese troops in the Ayutthaya Kingdom's captital

The Royal Chronicle of Myanmar composed in 1913 A.D. by Prince Narathip Praphanphong said :- 

Chaophraya Phitsanulok (Rueang)’s gathering was a traditional Ayutthayan courtiers of Siam Kingdom, being gathered purposefully to fight against Burmese troops controlled by King Rueang of Phitsanulok. The gathering’s territory was extended from north to south totaling 7 cities under his control including:

 List of cities under controlled by King Rueang  Northern city of Ayutthaya Kingdom
 Phitsanulok (as administration center)
 Sukhothai
 Si Satchanalai, Sawan Lok and Chaliang
 Kamphaeng Phet and Nakhon Chum
 Phitchit and Pak Yom
 Phra Bang
 Tung Yang (a.k.a Phichai)

Thai historians claimed that Chaophraya Phitsanulok (Rueang)’s gathering was the strongest and biggest gathering in the northern city, not only because the city was fortified by fourteen forts built by French engineers, ton of armaments and Ayutthaya courtiers, but also because the governor of Phitsanulok was skilled in battle and trusted as commander-in-chief by King Ekkathat and the Royal descendants of Ban Phlu Luang Dynasty.

The Royal Chronicle of History Regarding Our Wars with the Burmese during Krung Si Ayutthaya composed by Prince Damrong Rajanubhab said :-

Phitsanulok attacked by Priest King 
After the gathering was established, Chao Phra Fang, a.k.a Priest King or Sangharaja of Fang, personal name; Ruan, became a notorious sensuality and violence chief Buddhist monk, who was renowned for his supernatural powers and ruled Sawangburi or Sawangkhaburi city supported by many other monks, (Sawangburi is now a district of Uttaradit province in Rattanakosin Period), located at northward of Pitsanulok. All of the Priest King's officials and troops wore yellow robes.

In 1768. From mid-year onward, Chao Phra Fang initiated his marches to besiege Pitsanulok. King Rueang then arrayed his troops and engaged with Chao Phra Fang troops. The engagement occurred three times lasting up to six months.

The Royal Chronicle of Letters by the King's Own Hand, composed by Prince Damrong Rajanubhab said :- 

The Sangitiyavansa composed by Somdej Phra Wannaratna of Wat Phrachetupon in 1789, said :-

Incident of King Taksin to suppress Phitsanulok 

After King Taksin successfully suppressed Burmese troops at Pho-samton camp, located in Ayutthaya. In October 1768, King Taksin marched northward by land and river with troops forces with 15,000 men to Phitsanulok in order to suppress King Rueang’s gathering. Once King Rueang was informed the sign of foes, he arrayed Phisanulok troops by land and river downward to Koei Chai at Nakhon Sawan (upper Pho estuary) and appointed Luang Kosa, personal name; Yang,), who was strong skilled in topography of the northern territory of Ayutthaya Kingdom, as commander.

The battle tactics of Phitsanulok ever recorded, was to utilize Siamese slender boat as conveyance, to ensconce behind riverside hills and stealthily attack their foes. Meanwhile, it also flooded, so Phitsanulok troops’ gained an advantage over their foes.

Upon the arrival of King Taksin’s troops at Koei Chai, Phitsanulok troops immediately opened fire fearlessly and resoundingly on his troops. King Taksin suffered an injury to his left shin and retreated from Koei Chai back to Thonburi. Consequently, King Taksin was lost and failed to suppress King Rueang’s gathering.

The Royal Chronicle of Letters by the King's Own Hand, composed by Prince Damrong Rajanubhab said :-

The Royal Chronicle of Thonburi Kingdom Version of Phan Channumat (Choem) said :- 

Phraya Srisatchanalaibodi (Liang Siripalaka) said :-

Memoirs of Princess Narindaradevi said :-

And The first primogenitor of Phraya Srisahadep named Thongpeng composed by K.S.R. Kulap said :-

Death and collapse of the regime 
In November, 1768. King Rueang was seriously ill and died soon in 7 days at Chan Royal Palace of an abscess in his neck (another source said he died after 15 days.)) after overcoming King Taksin's defeat. Since his younger brother, Phraya Chaiyabun (Chan) or Phra Indara-akon became governor of Phitsanulok. Phitsanulok city was weakened as a result of the new ruler's lack of military capability, in contrast to the former governor. 

The Sangitiyavansa composed by Somdej Phra Wannaratna of Wat Phrachetupon in 1789, said :-

A verse drama of the Ramayana composed by King Taksin said :-

The Royal Chronicle of Letters by the King's Own Hand, composed by Prince Damrong Rajanubhab said :-

After Sawangburi's ruler, Chao Phra Fang acknowledged King Reang's death, he quickly deployed his troops to retake Phitsanulok. Phitsanulok was sieged with King Priest troops for 3 months by Priest King, and the townspeople were starving. 

The Royal Chronicle of Siam from the manuscript of British Museum, London. said :-

And The first primogenitor of Phraya Srisahadep named Thongpeng composed by K.S.R. Kulap said :-

In December 1768. There was espionage in Phitsanulok to lead Priest King's troops to invade the city. The new governor of Phitsanulok was captured and executed by Chao Phra Fang in February, 1769. The corpse of the new governor; Phraya Chaiyabun (Chan), was exposed over the gate of Phitsanulok city. Numbers of people in Phitsanulok were herded forcibly onto Sawangburi which is currently ruled by Chao Phra Fang, and many of them escaped to Thonburi, ruled by King Taksin, too. Phitsanulok’s gathering was completely collapsed from that time on.
Luang Kosa (yang) was a supporter of Chao Phra Fang side, and lately he gets appointed as commander in Phitsanulok.

Honors

Title

Titles and ranks appointed by King of Siam 
Chaophraya Phitsanulok's title during 1732–1767.

 Rueang officials and scribe at Krom Mahatthai in reign of King Thai Sa.
Luang Maha Ammatayadibodi or Luang Senamataya (Rueang) Northern interior officials at Krom Mahatthai at Phitsanulok, sakdina 1,600 in reign of King Borommakot.
Phra Rajcharittanonbahonbakdi (Rueang) Inspector as acting permanent secretary officials at Phitsanulok, sakdina 3,000 in reign of King Borommakot.
Phraya Phitsanulok (Rueang) Governor of Phitsanulok , sakdina 10,000 (First Class) in reign of King Borommakot.
Chaophraya Phitsanulok (Rueang) a.k.a Chaophraya Surasi, Governor of Phitsanulok , sakdina 10,000 (First Class) in reign of King Borommakot to King Ekkathat.

Enthronement 
Phrachao Phitsanulok or Chao Phitsanulok (1768) King Rueang of Phitsanulok as state–independent, in Thonburi interim.

Namesakes 

Chaophraya Phitsanulok Road. Phitsanulok province.
Phraya Surasi Road. Phitsanulok province.
Rochanakul Lane. Samut Prakan province.

Primogenitor of Noble surname 
Rochanakul. is Siamese surname no. 368 of the 6,432 Thai Surnames Record conferred by the King, bestowed upon Luang Phisonyutthakan (Puek) and Luang Likhitprecha (Plob), by King Rama VI on 15 July, 1913 and royally countersigned by The Prince Naresvararitta, Lord of the Privy Seal.
The Thai surnames record at the King Rama VI Memorial Hall, National Library of Thailand, stated that Chaophraya Phitsanulok (Rueang) was the grand primogenitor of surname; Rochanakul.

In popular culture 
Chaophraya Phitsanulok (Rueang)s corporeal presence and involved occurrences were mentioned in various contemporary works, viz.

 Thai literature The Sangitiyavansa or the Chronicle of Buddhist Councils The first Pali work belongs to The Chronicle of Pali literature, composed by Somdej Phra Wannaratna of Wat Phrachetupon a.k.a Phra Phimonlatham in 1789, early Rattanakosin Kingdom era. The Pali canonical text composition mentioned to Chaophraya Phitsanulok (Rueang) who was royal proclaimed himself as King of Siam, the post-second fall of Ayutthaya incident.

 International literature Yodaya Naing Mawgun by Letwe Nawrahta A contemporary Myanmar record of the second fall of Ayutthaya Kingdom translated by Soe Thuzar Myint. The record mentioned Phitsanulok troops as a courageous foe which Chaophraya Phitsanulok (Rueang) was commander-in-chief. The record said "Siamese reinforcements sent from Phitsanulok and other towns were routed. The poet portrays the Siamese as a courageous foe, a worthy adversary of the Myanmar whose commanders had to resort to innovative tactics."

 Verse Sam Krung A Thai poem composed by Prince Bidyalongkorn in 1942. The story of Chao Phitsanulok (Rueang) in which Prince Bidyalongkorn mentioned, was criticized the incidents and attacks on the current leadership in his descriptions, and attacks on the current leadership in his descriptions.

 Novel and Fiction Rattanakosin: The Birth of Bangkok. A Thai-Historical novel authored by Paul Adirex, mentioned an incident of Chaophraya Phisanulok’s Force arrangement to intercept the King Taksin's force-five thousand armies to conquer the Chaophraya Phitsanulok (Rueang)’s gathering in Nakhon Sawan, and the death of Chaophraya Phisanulok after his royal proclamation.Yot Sawettachat Thai historical novel, composed by Luang Wichitwathakan mentioned an engagement of governor of Phitsanuloks’s reinforcement with Burmese troops, and Phitsanulok’s seizing by Prince Chit rebellion.Chiwit khong prathet Thai historical novel, composed by Wissanu Krea-ngam based upon the second fall of Ayutthaya Kingdom incident and King Taksin’s reunification of Siam. The novel mentioned the Royal proclamation of Chaophraya Phitsanulok (Rueang) to exalt himself as King of Siam and Thongdi, father of King Rama I, get appointed as regent of Phitsanulok.

 Film and Television Fa Mai Thai historical drama mentioned Orkya Phra Phitsanulok (Rueang) cast by Attachai Anantamek.Sai Lohit' Thai historical drama mentioned after governor of Phitsanulok had marched Siamese troops and engaged Burmese at Sukhothai, Prince Chit seized Phitsanulok. The governor of Phitsanulok have to resort to suppress Prince Chit.

Notes

References 

Chaophraya
1719 births
1768 deaths
18th-century Thai people
Chao mueang of Thailand